Worth It may refer to:

Music
 Worth It (album), a 1996 album by Sammi Cheng
 "Worth It" (Danielle Bradbery song), 2018
 "Worth It" (Fifth Harmony song), 2015
 "Worth It" (Wanessa song), 2010
 "Worth It" (YK Osiris song), 2019
 "Worth It", a song by Beabadoobee from Fake It Flowers, 2020
 "Worth It", a song by Emma Bale, 2016
 "Worth It", a song by Lil Yachty from Nuthin' 2 Prove, 2018
 "Worth It", a song by Whitney Houston from I Look to You, 2009
 "Worth It", a song by YoungBoy Never Broke Again from Until Death Call My Name, 2018
 "Worth It (Perfect)", a song by Superfruit from Future Friends, 2017

Organization
  "Worth It" (Health Education Organization) an American health education organization

Television
 Worth It (TV series), an American online food show
 "Worth It" (Pose), a television episode